Levipyrgulina is a small genus of very small sea snails, pyramidellid gastropod mollusks or micromollusks. This genus is currently placed in the subfamily Chrysallidinae of the family Odostomiidae.

Shell description
The original description of the genus and the type species can be found at:

Life history
Nothing is known about the biology of the members of this genus. As is true of most members of the Pyramidellidae sensu lato, they are (were) most likely ectoparasites.

Species within the genus Levipyrgulina
 Levipyrgulina sulcata Laws, 1941 (Type species) Holotype in Auckland Museum, accession number AM71008
 Levipyrgulina marginata Laws, 1941

References

External links 
 Levipyrgulina sulcata illustration of type species

Pyramidellidae
Gastropods of New Zealand

de:Pyramidelloidea